Kim Yun-hye (born 19 January 1967) is a South Korean volleyball player. She competed in the women's tournament at the 1988 Summer Olympics.

References

1967 births
Living people
South Korean women's volleyball players
Olympic volleyball players of South Korea
Volleyball players at the 1988 Summer Olympics
Place of birth missing (living people)